Moberg is a surname. Those bearing it include:

 Carina Moberg (1966-2012), Swedish politician
Christina Moberg (born 1947), Swedish chemist
 David O. Moberg (born 1922), American scholar of religion
 David Moberg (born c. 1945), American journalist
 Elsa Moberg (1889–2001), oldest Swede on record
 Emilie Moberg (born 1991), Norwegian racing cyclist
 Eva Moberg (orienteer), Swedish orienteering competitor
 Eva Moberg (writer) (1932–2011), Swedish feminist and writer
 Gunnie Moberg (1941–2007), Swedish photographer and writer
 Ida Georgina Moberg (1859–1947), Finnish musician
 Lars-Erik Moberg (born 1957), Swedish canoer 
 Lennart Moberg (1918–1991), Swedish triple jumper
 Osvald "Moppe" Moberg (1888–1933), Swedish gymnast
 Peer Moberg (born 1971), Norwegian sailor
 Vilhelm Moberg (1898–1973), Swedish author and historian

See also